Balıkesir Airport  is a public/military airport in the city of Balıkesir, Turkey. It's located within Balıkesir city center. Currently there are no available flights operated from the airport. The new terminal building opened in 2020

Military usage
Balıkesir is home to the 9th Air Wing (Ana Jet Üs or AJÜ) of the 1st Air Force Command (Hava Kuvvet Komutanligi) of the Turkish Air Force (Türk Hava Kuvvetleri). Other wings of this command are located in Eskişehir (LTBI), Konya (LTAN), Ankara Akıncı (LTAE) and Bandırma (LTBG).

TUSLOG Detachment 184 used to be stationed here during the Cold War, supporting any required nuclear strike operations by the 191 and 192 Filos with the Lockheed F-104G/S. Some 25 nuclear weapons were reportedly stored at the base.

Statistics

See also 

 Balıkesir Koca Seyit Airport, another airport located in Balıkesir Province.

References

External links
 
 

Airports in Turkey
Turkish Air Force bases
Military in Balıkesir
Buildings and structures in Balıkesir Province
Transport in Balıkesir Province